Larry M. Wortzel (born 1947) served nine terms as a commissioner on the United States-China Economic and Security Review Commission of the United States Congress. A 32-year military veteran, he was a U.S. Army colonel, director of the Strategic Studies Institute of the United States Army War College, and vice president of The Heritage Foundation. He was a military attaché at the U.S. Embassy in Beijing, and witnessed the Tiananmen Massacre in 1989. He is considered one of the United States' top experts on China and its military strategy. He is Senior Fellow in Asian Security at the American Foreign Policy Council.

Career
Larry Wortzel received a B.A. degree from Columbus College (now Columbus State University) in Columbus, Georgia, and earned his Master's and Ph.D. degrees in political science from the University of Hawaiʻi.

Wortzel spent three years in the U.S. Marine Corps before attending college, and then enlisted in the U.S. Army in 1970, during the Vietnam War. He was assigned to the Army Security Agency in Thailand to monitor Chinese military communications in nearby Vietnam and Laos. By 1973 he graduated from the Infantry Officer Candidate School, Airborne training and  Ranger training. He is a graduate of the United States Army War College.

He shifted to military intelligence after serving as an infantry officer for four years. From 1978 to 1982, he served at the Intelligence Center Pacific of the U.S. Pacific Command. He then enrolled in advanced Chinese language studies at the National University of Singapore. Next he served as a counterintelligence special agent at the Office of the Secretary of Defense for four years, and worked in foreign intelligence with the U.S. Army Intelligence and Security Command.

From 1988 to 1990, Wortzel was an assistant military attaché at the American Embassy in Beijing, and witnessed and reported on the Tiananmen Square protests of 1989 and the subsequent army crackdown. In 1995, he returned to the embassy as the Army Attaché.

In 1997, Wortzel became the director of the Strategic Studies Institute of the U.S. Army War College, and a faculty member of the college. In 1999, he retired from the Army as a colonel after 32 years of military service.

From 1999 to 2006, Wortzel served as Asian Studies Center director and vice president for foreign policy at The Heritage Foundation. Since 2001, he has served for nine terms as a Commissioner of the U.S.-China Economic and Security Review Commission of the United States Congress. His term expired on December 31, 2020.

Personal
Wortzel is married and lives in Williamsburg, Virginia.

Selected publications

References

External links

1947 births
Living people
United States Army War College faculty
United States Army colonels
Columbus State University alumni
University of Hawaiʻi at Mānoa alumni
United States Army War College alumni
National University of Singapore alumni
American expatriates in China
People from Williamsburg, Virginia
United States military attachés
United States Marines